Vlake is a hamlet in the Dutch municipality of Reimerswaal. The  carries the A58 motorway under the canal through Zuid-Beveland.

Vlake is not a statistical entity, and the postal authorities have placed it under Yerseke.

Vlake used to have a church, but it was demolished and a large part of the village was demolished in 1802 for the construction of the canal through Zuid-Beveland.

References 

Populated places in Zeeland
Reimerswaal (municipality)